"Heat Waves" is a song by British experimental rock band Glass Animals, released as a single from their third studio album Dreamland on 29 June 2020. A sleeper hit, it is the band's signature song and biggest hit single to date. In addition to reaching number five on the UK Singles Chart and being a top-five hit in several other European countries, it reached number one in Australia, Canada, Lithuania, Switzerland and the United States, where it topped the Billboard Hot 100 for five weeks in early 2022 after a record-breaking 59-week climb to number one. At 91 weeks, it is the longest charting song on the Hot 100 of all time, surpassing "Blinding Lights" by The Weeknd. By September 2022, the song had accumulated more than two billion streams on Spotify. At the 2022 Brit Awards, "Heat Waves" was nominated for Best British Single. As of December 2022, Heat Waves is still featured in Spotify's Top 50 Global charts. It is the first song to remain in the top charts even after more than 2 years of its release.

Composition and other versions
Bayley stated that "Heat Waves" "is about loss and longing, and ultimately realising you are unable to save something". He said that "Also, this song is about memories and it's very nostalgic, and sometimes people feel more of that in the winter. Maybe that's part of the reason this song's hung around for so bloody long – everyone's locked inside and trapped in their own thoughts."

"Heat Waves" starts on a high and then drops into despair before rising again for a cheerful, optimistic finale, much like the crests and troughs of a real wave. Bayley came up with the chords one day while playing around on the guitar. He wrote the lyrics in just an hour, prompted by the death of a close friend whose birthday was in June.

"Heat Waves" is an example of Dreamlands incorporation of hip hop and electropop elements into Glass Animals' sound. It and "Space Ghost Coast to Coast" rejects the band's acoustic percussion and marimbas in favor of 808 sounds and skittering hi-hats. NMEs Hannah Mylrea categorized the song as "earnest R&B run through the Glass Animals filter", and Pitchforks Ian Cohen argued its guitars "could be plucked from any number of 'wavy hip-hop' sample packs meant to emulate Frank Ocean's 'Ivy' on a bedroom producer's budget". A major theme on Dreamland is the pursuit of brief pleasures to cope with the hardships of life, such as lust for others. On "Heat Waves", Bayley sings repeatedly, "Sometimes all I think about is you/Late nights in the middle of June."

The band ran a remix competition for the track, with 19-year-old British producer Shakur Ahmad winning and having his remix issued by the band, alongside a remix by American DJ Diplo in August 2020. Another remix is a collaboration with Puerto Rican rapper Iann Dior. A piano Simlish version was recorded by Bayley for The Sims 4, and was featured in a limited-time "Sims Sessions" in-game music event in 2021.

Critical reception
"Heat Waves" was met with positive reviews upon release, with music critics such as Robin Murray, Owen Richards, and Rob Waters praising the song as a "stunningly effective" pop track, "built on a delicious groove and utilising very conventional lyrical structures" while containing enough elements unique to Glass Animals to entice more listeners to them. No Ripcords Ethan Gordon generally found Dreamland "as momentarily annoying as it is infinitely forgettable" due to its combination of trap percussion and synthesizers being mostly "strained and unpleasant"; however, he considered "Heat Waves" to be the "strongest" mixture of those sounds.

Commercial performance
A sleeper hit, "Heat Waves" is the group's most successful single to date. It was voted into first place on the Australian Triple J Hottest 100 of 2020, making Glass Animals the first British act to top the countdown since Mumford & Sons won the 2009 poll with "Little Lion Man". It then spent seven weeks at the top of the Australian ARIA Singles Chart and was later certified as the number one song for 2021 in Australia. It reached No. 1 in March 2021, stayed there until April 2021, and returned to that position in March 2022. It is the first song ever to stay in the Australian top 10 for more than a year, staying there for 85 weeks. It also reached the top 20 in several territories.

In the United States, "Heat Waves" peaked at number one on the Billboard Hot 100 chart dated 12 March 2022, completing a record-breaking 59-week climb to the position. It dethroned Encantos "We Don't Talk About Bruno" after five consecutive weeks at number one. "Heat Waves" previously reached number 10 on the Hot 100 in its 42nd week on the chart, breaking the record for the longest climb to the top 10, surpassing Carrie Underwood's "Before He Cheats" (2007). The song also reached the top five in its 51st week on the chart, breaking the record previously set by Gabby Barrett's "I Hope" (2020). The song was in the top 10 up to its 80th week on the chart. No other song in the chart's history has reached such longevity. This longevity has been attributed to, among other things, a popular fan fiction which shipped Minecraft YouTubers Dream and GeorgeNotFound.

On the UK Singles Chart the single originally peaked at number 19 in the first half of 2021. After its inclusion in the EA Sports video game FIFA 21 and wide usage as backing music in various TikTok videos, the song re-entered at number 18 in September 2021 and continued to climb into the top 5. The viral video also helped the song climb back up 31 places to number 14 on the Irish Singles Chart in its 41st week on the chart, before peaking at number 5. The track has spent a total of 22 weeks in the top 10 to date, the most among tracks in 2021. The song reached number one on the Billboard Global 200 in the issue dated 5 March 2022, and also reached the same peak on the Global Excl. US chart.

Lyric video
A lyric video heavily based on the vaporwave imagery was released through Glass Animals official YouTube account on 20 July 2020. The video was produced by designer Notnarcs. It gained almost 30 million views during its first year on YouTube. As of September 2022, the lyric video on YouTube has amassed over 110 million views.

Music video
The music video for the song, directed by Colin Read, premiered on 29 June 2020. It shows frontman Dave Bayley walking through the streets of East London pulling a wagon stacked with several TVs, filmed by his neighbours using their phones during the COVID-19 lockdowns, before arriving at a venue, setting the TVs up on a stage that then display his bandmates playing their instruments, and singing the rest of the song. Bayley called it "a love letter to live music and the culture and togetherness surrounding it". As of September 2022, the music video has amassed over 400 million views on YouTube.

Track listing

Personnel
Glass Animals
 Dave Bayley – vocals, guitar, keyboards, drums, strings, percussion, producer, recording engineer
 Edmund Irwin-Singer – guitar, programming
 Drew MacFarlane – guitar, strings, programming
 Joe Seaward – drums

Technical personnel
 Riley McIntyre – recording engineer
 Chris Galland – mixing engineer
 Manny Marroquin – mixing engineer
 Chris Gehringer – mastering engineer

Charts

Weekly charts

Monthly charts

Year-end charts

Certifications

Release history

See also 
 List of highest-certified singles in Australia
 List of Billboard Hot 100 number ones of 2022
 List of Canadian Hot 100 number-one singles of 2022

References

External links
 
 
 
 
 

2020 songs
2020 singles
Billboard Global 200 number-one singles
Billboard Global Excl. U.S. number-one singles
Billboard Hot 100 number-one singles
British contemporary R&B songs
Canadian Hot 100 number-one singles
Glass Animals songs
Internet memes introduced in 2021
Number-one singles in Australia
Number-one singles in India
Number-one singles in Switzerland
Polydor Records singles
Republic Records singles
Psychedelic pop songs
British pop rock songs